The One More Light World Tour was the ninth headlining (eleventh overall) concert tour by American rock band Linkin Park. The tour supported their seventh studio album, One More Light (2017). Beginning in May 2017, the tour visited 21 cities in South America and Europe. Following the death of lead vocalist and frontman Chester Bennington on July 20, 2017, the North American leg and the rest of the tour were cancelled the following day, followed by the final leg of the tour in Japan on October 3, 2017.

Background
Starting October 2016, the band announced several music festival appearances in Argentina, France and Germany. Throughout the remainder of the year, more shows were revealed. In March 2017, a promotional trailer was released on YouTube to promote standalone concerts in the U.K. This was followed by the band performing several promotional concerts and press interviews.

The band announced the North American tour with a comical trailer which was released through Genius. The trailer showed Machine Gun Kelly being interviewed and Bennington and Shinoda intervening and asking him to tour with them, resulting him to leave the interview in amusement. Another comical video, for the promotion of Blink-182 co-headlining shows, known as "Welcome to Blinkin Park". The video included a couple on a tinder date taking Linkin Park and Blink-182 with them to decrease the awkwardness.

Tickets for the North American leg are sold through Ticketmaster's new "Verified Fan" program, an initiative to help prevent ticket scalping. The band announced $1 from each ticket sale will be donated to "Music for Relief", a charity foundation to aid survivors of natural disasters and environmental protection. Each ticket will also include a physical or digital copy of the band's latest album.

Commenting on the upcoming tour, guitarist Brad Delson stated: "Our fans know how much love we put into our live show. They know how much we enjoy the connection when we play a fan favorite on stage. The emotional and sonic content of this new batch of songs is going to bring a whole new dimension to the show."

On July 20, 2017, Chester Bennington died by suicide in his home in Los Angeles suburbs of Palos Verdes Estates, California. His final performance with the band was on July 6 at the Barclaycard Arena in Birmingham, England. Due to his death, the status of the remaining tour dates was placed into question. The next day, Live Nation announced that the North American leg would be canceled, and customers would be refunded. Two months later, the band announced the cancellation of the Japan leg of the tour, while also providing refund information.

Opening acts

Machine Gun Kelly 
Rise Against 
Turbopótamos 
Wu-Tang Clan 
One Ok Rock 
Snoop Dogg 

Nothing but Thieves, Sum 41, Blink 182 
Sum 41 
Rob Zombie 
Slayer

Setlist 
The following setlists were obtained from the concert of May 11, 2017, held at the Estadio Nacional de Lima in Lima, Peru, and the concert of July 3, 2017, held at The O2 Arena in London, England. It is not intended to represent all concerts for the duration of the tour.

Completed shows

Cancelled shows

Festivals and other miscellaneous performances

Maximus Festival
Download Festival
Aerodrome
Nova Rock Festival
Impact Festival
Independent Days Festival
Hellfest Open Air
Hurricane Festival
Southside Festival
Volt Fesztivál
Bråvalla festival
Rock Werchter
Welcome to Blinkin Park
Welcome to Blinkin Park

Personnel
 Chester Bennington – lead vocals, and rhythm guitar (first half of tour, died on July 20, 2017)
 Rob Bourdon – drums, percussion
 Brad Delson – lead guitar, keyboards on "Waiting for the End", acoustic guitar on "Sharp Edges", synthesizer on "Burn It Down"
 Dave "Phoenix" Farrell – bass guitar, backing vocals, samplers on "Good Goodbye" and "Lost in the Echo", rhythm guitar on "Leave Out All the Rest"
 Joe Hahn – turntables, samples, backing vocals
 Mike Shinoda – lead vocals, rhythm and lead guitar, keyboards, piano, rapping, and backing vocals (first half of tour)

References 

Linkin Park concert tours
2017 concert tours
Concert tours of Europe
Concert tours of South America
May 2017 events in South America
June 2017 events in Europe
July 2017 events in Europe
Cancelled concert tours
Cancelled events in the United States